Stefan Birkner (born 12 April 1973 in Münsterlingen) is a German politician for the Free Democratic Party (FDP). From 2011 to 2023, he chaired the FDP in Lower Saxony.

Political career
Birkner was elected to the State Parliament of Lower Saxony in the 2008 state elections. However, in February 2008 he left the Landtag to become a State Secretary for the State Minister of the Environment in the second cabinet Wulff, Hans-Heinrich Sander. He was replaced by Christian Grascha. From January 2012 until 2013, he served as State Minister for Environment, Energy and Climate Protection in the government of Minister-President David McAllister.

In September 2017, Birkner succeeded Christian Dürr as chairman of the FDP's parliamentary group.

In the negotiations to form a so-called traffic light coalition of the Social Democrats (SPD), the Green Party and the FDP following the 2021 federal elections, Birkner led his party's delegation in the working group on environment policy; his co-chairs from the other parties were Rita Schwarzelühr-Sutter (SPD) and Steffi Lemke (Bündnis 90/Die Grünen).

Birkner was nominated by his party as delegate to the Federal Convention for the purpose of electing the President of Germany in 2022.

Other activities
 Federal Network Agency for Electricity, Gas, Telecommunications, Post and Railway (BNetzA), Alternate Member of the Advisory Board (2012–2013)

References

 

Free Democratic Party (Germany) politicians
Members of the Landtag of Lower Saxony
1973 births
Living people